In demonology, Marbas or Barbas is a demon described in the Ars Goetia.  He is described as the Great President of Hell governing thirty-six legions of demons. He answers truly on hidden or secret things, causes and heals diseases, gives wisdom and knowledge in mechanical arts, and can change men into other shapes. He is depicted as a great lion that, under the conjurer's request, changes shape into a man.

The name Barbas also comes from the Latin "barba", beard, hellebore (a plant used in witchcraft, especially to invoke demons), and also a male name.

See also

References

Sources
S. L. MacGregor Mathers, A. Crowley, The Goetia: The Lesser Key of Solomon the King (1904). 1995 reprint: .

Goetic demons